Louis Santerre (born 26 May 1959) is a Canadian former wrestler who competed in the 1984 Summer Olympics.

References

External links
 

1959 births
Living people
Olympic wrestlers of Canada
Wrestlers at the 1984 Summer Olympics
Canadian male sport wrestlers
Pan American Games medalists in wrestling
Pan American Games silver medalists for Canada
Pan American Games bronze medalists for Canada
Wrestlers at the 1979 Pan American Games
Wrestlers at the 1983 Pan American Games
20th-century Canadian people